Sian (Sihan) is a Kajang language of Brunei and Sarawak.

External links

Languages of Brunei
Languages of Malaysia
Punan languages
Endangered Austronesian languages